The 1989 Tirreno–Adriatico was the 24th edition of the Tirreno–Adriatico cycle race and was held from 9 March to 15 March 1989. The race started in Bacoli and finished in San Benedetto del Tronto. The race was won by Tony Rominger of the Chateau d'Ax team.

General classification

References

1989
1989 in Italian sport